Organ Stop Pizza is a restaurant located in Mesa, Arizona. Its primary attraction is as the home of what it says is the largest Wurlitzer theater organ in the world. Powered by three turbine blowers (with a fourth as a standby) it has more than 7,000 pipes. The original organ was built for the Denver Theater and was installed in 1927. It saw service there until the 1930s. Rebuilt in 1975, including pieces from other Wurlitzers, its current spec is a 4/82 (4 Manual 82 rank organ)

It is a frequent recipient of Phoenix New Times annual "Best of Phoenix" awards.

History
The first Organ Stop Pizza location opened in 1972 at the corner of 7th St and Missouri Ave in Phoenix, Arizona. A second location opened in Mesa near Southern Ave and Dobson Rd in 1975. There was also a location in Tucson for a short time.

In 1984, the original owners of the restaurant sold the Phoenix location to a local real estate developer who subsequently closed it. The original Mesa location was sold to an employee of the restaurant the same year. In 1995, the original Mesa location was closed and replaced by a new, larger facility near Southern Ave and Stapley Dr.

References

External links
 Official website
 Arizona Republic article
 Index of Phoenix New Times articles

Companies based in Mesa, Arizona
Pizzerias in the United States
Restaurants established in 1972
Public venues with a theatre organ
1972 establishments in Arizona